Colonel Rose Mary Sheldon (born October 10, 1948) held the Henry King Burgwyn, Jr. Chair of Military History at the Virginia Military Institute, where she taught from 1993 to 2019. She is an expert in intelligence operations in the ancient world.  She received her doctorate in ancient history from the University of Michigan for which she won a National Intelligence Book award in 1987.  In 1981, she became a fellow of the American Academy in Rome.  Sheldon has served on the editorial board of the Journal of Military History, and of the International Journal of Intelligence and CounterIntelligence.

Works

See also
List of fellows of the American Academy in Rome (1971–1990), Sheldon became a fellow in 1981
William F. Friedman, Sheldon published the Friedman archives
Sator Square, a topic Sheldon has published on

References

1948 births
Living people
Hunter College alumni
University of Michigan alumni
Virginia Military Institute faculty
American military historians
Historians of ancient Greece
Historians of ancient Rome
American Academy in Rome
American women historians
Women classical scholars
21st-century American women educators
21st-century American educators
20th-century American women educators
20th-century American educators
American colonels
Counterintelligence analysts
American historians of espionage